The 2009 Trofeo Federale is the twenty-fourth edition of the San Marino four-club supercup competition. The competition will begin on 23 September 2009. The clubs involved are the league champions Tre Fiori, cup winners Juvenes/Dogana and cup runners-up Domagnano. Because Juvenes/Dogana were also the league runners-up, the league semi-finalist Murata are also admitted into the competition.

Tournament bracket

Trofeo Federale
Trofeo